

Bin Reaper 3: Old Testament
Bin Reaper 3: Old Testament is the second studio album by American rapper BabyTron, released on October 28, 2022, through Hip Hop Lab and Empire. It is his first studio album since Megatron (2022) and follows his 2021 mixtape Bin Reaper 2.

Critical reception

In a lukewarm review, AllMusic's Paul Simpson wrote, "BabyTron has a sharp, quick-witted style and no shortage of clever one-liners and pop culture references, and a few tracks like "Top 2 Not 2" and "AirTron" sport exciting beat changes."

Track listing

Charts

Bin Reaper 3: New Testament

Bin Reaper 3: New Testament is the third studio album by American rapper BabyTron, released on January 13, 2023, through Hip Hop Lab and Empire. It follows his 2022 studio album Bin Reaper 3: Old Testament (2022).

Critical reception

In a lukewarm review, AllMusic's Paul Simpson wrote, "The 26-track album features the same type of quick-witted, cartoon-referencing rhymes as its predecessor, but with more polished production, and appearances from major guest stars like Rico Nasty and Lil Yachty"

Track listing

Charts

References

2022 albums
2023 albums
BabyTron albums